Tamasha With Harsha is an Indian Telugu-language comedy talk show hosted by Harsha Chemudu Directed by Sarath Chandra Prasad and created by Allu Aravind for Aha, the show premiered on 6 November 2020. It is the first talk show that got streamed on Aha.

Concept 
A laugh-out-loud dose of tamasha, hosted by Harsha Chemudu as he interacts with celebs and roasts them savagely and hilariously. High on energy, fun banter and in his style, a complete laugh riot. A new episode airs every Friday.

Production 
The show was announced in August 2020.

Episodes 

Navdeep and Niharika Konidela are the first guests to enter the show followed by Suhas, Sandeep Raj, Kartikeya Gummakonda, Payal Rajput, Satya, Sudarshan, Raj Tarun, Chandini Chowdary, Siddu Jonnalagadda, Ravikanth Perepu, Aditya Mandala, Sumanth, Nandita Swetha, Anand Deverakonda and Varsha Bollamma.

Reception 
Writing about the talk show, 123Telugu stated that: "Harsha is quite good with his hosting skills and is quite witty as well."

References

External links 

 
 Tamasha With Harsha on aha

Indian television talk shows
Telugu-language web series
2020 Indian television series debuts
2020 Indian television series endings
Aha (streaming service) original programming